Narberth Food Festival is an annual food festival held at Town Moor, Narberth, Pembrokeshire.

Overview

The festival was established in 1998 and is run by volunteers. It takes place in September over a weekend and has up to 150 businesses taking part, with 99% being local and Welsh retailers. It has up to 7,000 visitors (2017). There is an entrance fee for adults. 

The festival has food stalls from local and Welsh producers. There is a Talk and Taste tent where producers share their products and also a licensed bar. 

Other activities include celebrity chef demonstrations, live music from local bands, and activities for children.

Previous musicians supporting the festival have included Jodie Marie who is from Narberth and other local groups such as the Saint City Jazz Band and Carmarthen Ukuleles.

Awards

The festival has twice won the gold award for Best Event in the Pembrokeshire Tourism Awards.

Economic impact

A survey commissioned by Welsh Government of attendees at the festival showed that 91% of those surveyed said that the festival had increased their awareness of local food and produce. Respondents were also asked how much they expected to spend in the local area, not including the food festival, with 23% saying they expected to spend between £10 and £20, and a further 22% expecting to spend between £20 and £50.

Videos
 Narberth Food Festival
 Narberth Food Festival 2012
 Narberth Food Festival 2013
 Narberth Food Festival 2014
 Narberth Food Festival 2016
 Narberth Food Festival 2017

Further reading
 Business Wales, Food and Drink

About Wales, Welsh Food Festivals

See also 
Narberth, Pembrokeshire
Pembrokeshire 
Cuisine of Pembrokeshire.

References 

Food and drink festivals in the United Kingdom
Pembrokeshire
Annual events in Wales
1998 establishments in Wales
Recurring events established in 1998
Autumn events in Wales